Aulacopone is a genus of ant in the subfamily Heteroponerinae containing the single species Aulacopone relicta. The genus was described by Arnoldi (1930) from a unique dealate female collected at Ələzəpin (Alazapin), near Lankaran, in Azerbaijan S.S.R., Soviet Union (now Azerbaijan), near its border with Iran. The specimen was taken in galleries of the formicine ant Lasius emarginatus, under the bark of an oak stump, in mid-montane forest.

References

Arnol'di, K. V. (1930). "Studien über die Systematik der Ameisen. IV. Aulacopone, eine neue Ponerinengattung (Formicidae) in Russland." Zoologischer Anzeiger 89:139-144.

External links

Heteroponerinae
Monotypic ant genera
Hymenoptera of Asia
Endemic fauna of Azerbaijan